Scythris deresella is a moth species of the family Scythrididae. It was described by Mark I. Falkovitsh in 1969. It is found in Kazakhstan and Uzbekistan.

References

deresella
Moths described in 1969
Moths of Asia